Oksen may refer to:
Oksen Mirzoyan, Soviet weightlifter
Oksen Ourfalian, Lebanese footballer
Öskən, Azerbaijan
Oksyon (Oksen), a diminutive of the Russian male first name Avksenty